Fonville is an unincorporated community located along U.S. Highway 401 in the Stewarts Creek Township of Harnett County, North Carolina between Bunnlevel and the Cumberland County town of Linden .

References
 

Unincorporated communities in Harnett County, North Carolina
Unincorporated communities in North Carolina